Rémigny is a municipality in northwestern Quebec, Canada, in the Témiscamingue Regional County Municipality.

History
In 1920, the geographic township of Rémigny was formed, named after Captain Rémigny of the Régiment de la Sarre, who was made a Knight of the Order of Saint Louis in 1759 and captain of Grenadier Company in 1760. The community had its start in 1935 when sixty settlers from Joliette arrived on the northern shores of Barrière Bay of Des Quinze Lake as part of the Vautrin Settlement Plan. In 1978, the place was incorporated and named after the township.

Demographics
Population trend:
 Population in 2011: 279 (2006 to 2011 population change: -12.3%)
 Population in 2006: 318
 Population in 2001: 367
 Population in 1996: 364
 Population in 1991: 381

Private dwellings occupied by usual residents: 135 (total dwellings: 154)

Mother tongue:
 English as first language: 12.5%
 French as first language: 83.9%
 English and French as first language: 0%
 Other as first language: 3.6%

Climate

See also
 List of municipalities in Quebec

References

Municipalities in Quebec
Incorporated places in Abitibi-Témiscamingue
Témiscamingue Regional County Municipality